Damgate Marshes, Acle is a  biological Site of Special Scientific Interest between Norwich and Great Yarmouth in Norfolk. It is part of the Broadland Ramsar site and The Broads Special Area of Conservation.

These traditionally managed grazing marshes and dykes are a nationally important wetland site. Their ecological significance lies mainly in the dykes, which have several uncommon water plants and a great diversity of aquatic invertebrates.

The Weavers Way footpath goes through the site.

References

Sites of Special Scientific Interest in Norfolk
Special Areas of Conservation in England
Ramsar sites in England
Acle